The Banks Islands (in Bislama Bankis) are a group of islands in northern Vanuatu. Together with the Torres Islands to their northwest, they make up the northernmost province of Torba. In 2009, the islands had a population of 8,533. The island group's combined land area is 780 km2.

Geography
Gaua's freshwater Lake Letas, in its volcanic crater, is the largest lake in Vanuatu. 
A slightly smaller island in the group, Vanua Lava,
To the east of Vanua Lava are two islets in the groupo, Ravenga and Kwakea (also spelled Qakea). Sola, the provincial capital, is on Vanua Lava. The third largest island in the group, Ureparapara (also known as Parapara), is an old volcanic cone that has been breached by the sea, forming a bay, known as Divers Bay, on its east coast.

To the east of these larger islands lie a number of smaller ones. Other small islands in this eastern chain in the Banks Island group include the Rowa Islands (also called the Reef Islands), which are a few very small, low islands on a coral atoll. Mota Lava is the largest and highest (411 m) of this eastern chain of islands; off its southern coast, attached by high corals that can be waded through at low tide, is the tiny islet of Ra. The islands of Mota, Merig, and Merelava complete the southeastern part of the archipelago.

Islands

Economy
The principal economic activity is subsistence agriculture, although copra, coffee and (on Gaua) cacao are grown for export. The sulphur deposits of Mount Suretamate on Vanua Lava were formerly worked by a French company. Tourism is increasingly important on the islands, which can be reached by airplane.

Transport
There are airports on Mota Lava, Vanua Lava and Gaua, served by Air Vanuatu, which operates a few flights each week and Air Taxi Vanuatu as requested. Ships come to these islands, principally to pick up the products being exported, but they will also take passengers.

History

Archaeologists have found ancient obsidian in Motalava, Vanua Lava and Gaua, and they have found Lapita pottery on Motalava.

Between 25 and 29 April 1606, the Banks Islands became the first part of Vanuatu to be discovered by a European explorer: A Spanish expedition led by the Portuguese explorer Pedro Fernández de Quirós sailed past Merelava and stopped at Gaua before landing on Espiritu Santo and establishing a short-lived colony there. Merelava was charted as San Marcos, Mota Lava as Lágrimas de San Pedro (St. Peter's tears), Vanua Lava as Portal de Belén (Stable at Bethlehem), and Gaua as Santa María.

Captain James Cook explored Vanuatu in 1774, and believed he had seen the whole chain, but he did not see the Banks Islands. They were explored by William Bligh, of the British Navy, and named after his patron, Sir Joseph Banks. They were charted by Matthew Flinders. Vanua Lava was first explored by a New Zealand bishop, George Augustus Selwyn in 1859.

Languages

The inhabitants of the Banks Islands speak 15 different languages. Several are endangered, being spoken by no more than a few hundred — and, in some cases, no more than a handful - of last speakers.

All of these languages belong to the Oceanic subgroup of the Austronesian language family.

Notes

References
 .
 .
 .
 .

Islands of Vanuatu
Archipelagoes of the Pacific Ocean
Torba Province